Philip Dafydd (c. 1732 – c. 1814) was a Welsh Methodist exhorter, and a poet.

Methodism
Dafydd lived in the Newcastle Emlyn area, and was by trade a clog maker. Before a local Methodist chapel was built there in 1776, he is known to have held regular society meetings at his own house.

Poetry
The poetical works of Dafydd include elegies on Daniel Rowland (printed in 1797) and William Williams Pantycelyn (printed in 1791).

References

Welsh male poets
18th-century Welsh poets
1732 births
1814 deaths
18th-century British male writers